Marazad (also in Azerbijani Turkish as (Ilanliaza-ایلانلی آزا) and Marāzād; also known as Mārāzāt) is a village in Daran Rural District, in the Central District of Jolfa County, East Azerbaijan Province, Iran. At the 2006 census, its population was 233, in 86 families. Its native name is ilanliaza that includes of ilan (snake) and aza (old name of region).

References 

Populated places in Jolfa County